Diya Aur Toofan may refer to:

 Diya Aur Toofan (1969 film), a 1969 Pakistani Urdu romantic comedy film
 Diya Aur Toofan (1995 film), a 1995 Hindi language Indian film